Anand Audio is an Indian music record label company in Karnataka. It is primarily known for publishing and marketing Sandalwood cinema sound tracks.

History
Anand Audio was founded on 25 March 1999 by late Mohan Chabria.

List of artists
Anuradha Bhat
B. R. Chaya
Chaitra H. G.
Chinmayi
Indu Nagaraj
K. S. Chithra
Priyadarshini
Priya Himesh
arjun janya [music directer]

Production filmography

YouTube presence
Anand Audio joined YouTube on 10 August 2011, and has around 8.92 million subscribers on end of February 2021.

References

External links
Official website 
On Youtube
On Twitter
On Facebook

Record label distributors
Record labels established in 1999
Music companies of India
Indian companies established in 1999
Indian music record labels
Music-related YouTube channels